Ramu is a 1987 Indian Telugu-language drama film, produced by D. Ramanaidu under the Suresh Productions banner and directed by Y. Nageswara Rao. It stars Nandamuri Balakrishna and Rajani, with music composed by S. P. Balasubrahmanyam. It is a remake of the Tamil film Per Sollum Pillai.

Plot 
The film begins with an ideal couple Advocate Ramesam and Gayatri Devi chief editor of a newspaper living festively with their four children Girija, Satish, Ramesh, and Jalaja. Once, an orphan boy Ramu comes to their aid by endangering his life. So, they adopt him as their elder son. Years roll by, and Ramu becomes the pulse of the family who adores his fosters, dotes on his siblings, and falls for maid Ganga. Girija marries a wily Gopalam one that intrudes into the house and tries to set a rift. Moreover, Satish & Ramesh envy the dominance of Ramu. Besides, Bhupathi a satanic smuggler, Gayatri Devi always exposes his felonies which begrudge him. Hence, he proceeds to knit his roughish son Pradeep with Jalaja. Just then, Bhupathi spells filthy about Gayatri and she smacks him. Inflamed Bhupathi in cahoots with Gopalam instigates the labor and lockout the press when Gayatri collapses with a heart attack. 

However, Ramu extricates her. Then, Gopalam provokes Ramesh & Satish to grab the power and a clash arises which makes Ramu quit the house. Looking at the anomalous occurrences, Ramesam decides to testament the property in the name of Ramu. Being cognizant of it, Bhupathi kills Ramesam which follows the bankruptcy of his depraved sons. During that plight, Ramu shields his mother and challenges her to restart the press. Accordingly, he catches hold of the smuggling racket of Bhupathi, and with the reward amount, he compasses purpose. The first edition is published against Bhupathi, so, he abducts the entire family when Ramesh & Satish also reform. At last, Ramu rescues them by eliminating Bhupathi and the court sentenced him to a short-term penalty. Finally, the movie ends on a happy note with Ramu acquitting and reunion of the family.

Cast 

Nandamuri Balakrishna as Ramu
Rajani as Seeta
Satyanarayana as Bhupathi
Sharada as Gayatri Devi
Jaggayya as Lawyer Raghava Rao
Sudhakar as Gopalam
Chalapathi Rao as Umapathi
Balaji as Pradeep
Hari Prasad as Satish
Bhaskar as Ramesh
Suthi Velu as Amarasilpi Suthi Velu Swamy
P. L. Narayana
Babu Mohan
K. K. Sarma
Chidatala Appa Rao as Gudla Seenaiah
Dham
Gowtham Raju as Bus Conductor
Deepa as Girja
Malashri as Jalaja
Jaya Malini as Guydela Gowramma
Anuradha as Naadi Nurasamma
Rama Prabha as Bodi Ramamma
Sri Lakshmi
Krishnaveni as Kothimera Kondamma
Mamatha as Pidakala Peramma
Anitha as Lakshmi
Master Rajesh as Dumbu

Soundtrack 
Music composed by S. P. Balasubrahmanyam. Lyrics were written by Veturi.

References

External links 

1980s Telugu-language films
1987 drama films
1987 films
Films scored by S. P. Balasubrahmanyam
Indian drama films
Suresh Productions films
Telugu remakes of Tamil films